The following is a List of Azerbaijani-language poets.

North Azerbaijan

Ashig Alasgar
Mammad Araz
Hamid Arzulu
Aşık Khanlar
Babi Badalov
Abbasgulu Bakikhanov
Vagif Bayatly Oner
Mirvarid Dilbazi
Piruz Dilenchi
Teymur Elchin
Fuzûlî
Fikrat Goja
Madina Gulgun
Mahammad Hadi
Izzeddin Hasanoglu
Almas Ildyrym
Hamlet Isakhanli
Jafar Jabbarly
Jafargulu agha Javanshir
Ahmad Javad
Huseyn Javid
Nusrat Kasamanli
Mikayil Mushfig
Imadaddin Nasimi
Khurshidbanu Natavan
Ali Nazmi
Mammed Said Ordubadi
Baba Punhan
Ramiz Rovshan
Suleyman Rustam
Mirza Alakbar Sabir
Abbas Sahhat
Bahar Shirvani
Seyid Azim Shirvani
Khalil Rza Uluturk
Mehdigulu Khan Vafa
Molla Panah Vagif
Bakhtiyar Vahabzadeh
Aliagha Vahid
Mirza Shafi Vazeh
Molla Vali Vidadi
Samad Vurgun
Gasim bey Zakir

Iranian Azerbaijan

Piruz Dilenchi
Madina Gulgun
Habib Saher
Mohammad-Hossein Shahriar

References

Azerbaijani-language poets
Azerbaijani-language writers
Poets